The 1948 United States presidential election in Wyoming took place on November 2, 1948, as part of the 1948 United States presidential election. State voters chose three representatives, or electors, to the Electoral College, who voted for president and vice president.

Wyoming was won by President Harry S. Truman (D–Missouri), running with the Senate Majority Leader Alben W. Barkley, with 51.62 percent of the popular vote, against the 47th Governor of New York Thomas E. Dewey (R–New York), running with California Governor and future Chief Justice of the United States Earl Warren, with 47.27 percent of the popular vote, despite the fact that Dewey had previously won the state four years earlier.

As of 2020, this is the last time in which Wyoming voted more Democratic than the national average; the state is now heavily Republican. It would only a support a Democratic presidential nominee one more time, during Lyndon B. Johnson's 1964 landslide. This would also be the last time that Wyoming was decided by a single digit margin until 1992.

Results

Dewey won the state in 1944 by a 2.46% margin, or 2,502 votes. However, in this election, Truman won the state, by 4.35%, or 4,407 votes. This was the last time a Democratic presidential candidate won the state until Lyndon B. Johnson in 1964, as throughout the 50s, the state transformed into a Republican stronghold. Since 1964, no Democratic presidential candidate has carried the state, and as a matter of fact, no Democrat has even been able to reach 40% of the vote.

Results by county

See also
 United States presidential elections in Wyoming

References

Wyoming
1948
1948 Wyoming elections